Mireya Cueto (February 3, 1922 – April 26, 2013) was a Mexican puppeteer, writer and dramaturg. She was also co-founder of the national marionette museum Museo Nacional de Títeres (MUNATI) in Huamantla, Tlaxcala.

Biography 
Cueto, born on February 3, 1922, in Mexico City, is one of two daughters of artists Lola and Gérman, who were also well-known puppeteers.

Since 2001, the Consejo Nacional para la Cultura y las Artes (CONACULTA) has carried out annually the national puppetry festival "Festival Nacional de Títeres Mireya Cueto" in honor of her. She died on April 26, 2013.

References

External links 
 

1922 births
2013 deaths
Mexican puppeteers
Mexican women dramatists and playwrights
People from Mexico City
20th-century Mexican dramatists and playwrights
20th-century Mexican women writers